Chloroclystis plinthochyta is a moth in the family Geometridae. It was described by Turner in 1931. It is endemic to Australia (Queensland).

Adults have greyish-brown patterned wings.

References

External links

Moths described in 1931
plinthochyta
Endemic fauna of Australia